Quercus seemannii is a species of flowering plant in the family Fagaceae, native from southeastern Mexico to Central America. It was first described by Frederik Liebmann in 1854.  It is placed in section Lobatae.

Distribution
Quercus seemannii is native to southeastern Mexico, Costa Rica, El Salvador, Guatemala, Honduras, Nicaragua, and Panama.

References

seemannii
Flora of Costa Rica
Flora of El Salvador
Flora of Guatemala
Flora of Honduras
Flora of Southeastern Mexico
Flora of Nicaragua
Flora of Panama
Plants described in 1854
Oaks of Mexico